The women's 10,000 metres at the 2022 Commonwealth Games, as part of the athletics programme, took place in the Alexander Stadium on 3 August 2022. 

Eilish McColgan won the gold medal in a new Commonwealth games record time. Her mother Liz McColgan won the same event at the 1986 and 1990 Commonwealth Games.

Records
Prior to this competition, the existing world and Games records were as follows:

Schedule
The schedule was as follows:

All times are British Summer Time (UTC+1)

Results

Final
The medals were determined in the final.

References

Women's 10,000 metres
2018
2022 in women's athletics